The European Alliance for Freedom and Democracy (EAFD, ;) is a European political party founded in summer 2020 by the non-attached MEPs Mislav Kolakušić and Dorien Rookmaker.

According to the EAFD, its policy is based on the following principles: the rule of law and the fight against corruption both at the level of the EU and at the level of its member states, freedom of thought and speech as well as equality between citizens and between the member states of the EU.

The EAFD's application for entry in the register of the competent authority for European political parties and European political foundations was rejected on 1 October 2020. This was justified by the fact that the member parties of the EAFD are not represented in a quarter of the member states in a parliament.

After other parties joined, in particular the Croatian Živi zid and the Polish Kukiz'15, the party submitted a renewed application for registration in the summer of 2021.

Members

Former members 

  10 Times Better
  Together for the People

Leadership 

 President: Mislav Kolakušić
 Vice President and Treasurer: Dorien Rookmaker

External links 

 EAFD website
 Former EAFD website

References 

Political parties established in 2020
Pan-European political parties
Populist parties